Heini Koivumieni (born 1973) is a Finnish strongwoman competitor who has achieved numerous podium finishes at the World's Strongest Woman contest.

Koivuniemi competed five times in the World's Strongest Woman contests, finishing 2nd in 2001, and third in 2002 and 2003. Koivuniemi has also won Europe's Strongest Woman in 2002, and Finland's Strongest Woman in 2001 and 2003.

Heini was featured in a BBC documentary film entitled "Strongwomen" in 2002. The film documented the training leading up to the 2002 World's Strongest Woman contest, as well as a behind-the-scenes look at the actual contest itself. The film also featured American Jill Mills and 2 British competitors including 2002 runner-up Abbey Haigh from Scotland.

Koivuniemi holds a Guinness world record for throwing a beer keg for height, she threw a  beer keg over a bar at a height of 3.46 meters (11 ft 4.2in).

Heini also won the 1999 Ms. Galaxy Europe contest in Kokkola, Finland on May 20, 1999. The contest consisted of an obstacle course, and a figure/posing routine.

References

1973 births
Finnish strength athletes
Living people
Strongwomen